Sakis Kouvas  or Athanasios Kouvas or Thanasis Kouvas (Σάκης Κουβάς, Αθανάσιος Κουβάς, Θανάσης Κουβάς; born in 1946) is a Greek former footballer who played as a midfielder.

Career
Kouvas began playing football for Vyzas F.C. at age 16, transferred to Panathinaikos in 1971 and played in 1971 Intercontinental Cup. He scored 73 Greek league goals for Vyzas and Panathinaikos, making him one of the league's all-time leading goal-scorers. Kouvas won the Greek championship with Panathinaikos in 1972.

He made his only national appearance on 30 September 1971, for the Greece national team.

References

External links
 

1946 births
Living people
Greek footballers
Association football midfielders
Greece international footballers
Super League Greece players
Super League Greece 2 players
Panathinaikos F.C. players
Vyzas F.C. players